Aisling is an Irish feminine given name meaning "dream" or "vision". It refers to an aisling, a poetic genre that developed in Irish poetry during the 17th and 18th centuries. There is no evidence that it was used as a given name before the 20th century. The name is included in Reverend Patrick Woulfe's 1923 collection of Irish names, with the comment that the name was in use in Derry and Omeath.

There are many variant anglicised forms of the name including Ashling, Aislin, Aislinn, Aislene, Ashlyn, and Ashlynn.

Aisling held steady in the top 20 girls' names in Ireland from 1984 to 1996  and is therefore often linked with the millennial generation in Ireland, most notably in the "Oh My God What A Complete Aisling" novels.

Aisling was the 31st most popular name for baby girls in Ireland in 2005, while Ashlyn was the 140th most popular name for baby girls in the United States in 2006, and the variant spelling Ashlynn the 293rd most popular name for baby girls in the United States in 2006. Ashlyn is also occasionally regarded as a modern name derived from both Ashley and Lynn.

People
Aisling Bea (born 1984), Irish comedian
Aisling Burnand (born 1964), British businesswoman and lobbyist
Aisling Daly (born 1987), Irish mixed martial arts fighter
Aisling Franciosi (born 1993), Irish-Italian actress
Aisleyne Horgan-Wallace (born 1978), British glamour model and Big Brother contestant
Aislinn Hunter (born 1969), Canadian writer
Aislin Jones (born 2000), Australian skeet shooter
Aisling Loftus (born 1990), English actress of Irish parentage
Aislín McGuckin (born 1974), Northern Irish actress
Aislinn Meaney (born 1998), Irish association footballer
Ashling Murphy (died 2022), Irish primary school teacher and traditional musician, suspected of being murdered
Aisling O'Neill, Irish actress
Aisling O'Sullivan (born 1968), Irish actress
Aislinn Paul (born 1994), Canadian actress
Aisling Swaine, Irish academic
Aislin, the pen name of Canadian political cartoonist Terry Mosher (born 1942)

Fictional characters
Aisling, the titular subject in the song "Aisling", on Shane MacGowan's 1994 album The Snake
Aisling, the main character in Malinda Lo's novel Ash
Aisling in the Irish animated TV programme Ballybraddan
Aisling in the anonymous novel Diary of an Oxygen Thief
Aisling, a hero in the video game Gigantic
Aisling in the novel Son of the Shadows
Aisling, aspiring film director in the play Stones in His Pockets
Aisling, a young faerie girl in the animated film The Secret of Kells
Aisling, the protagonist of the Aisling book series by Emer McLysaght and Sarah Breen, Irish Book Awards 2018 & 2019 winner
Ashling, the Pilgrim, a character in the TCG Magic: The Gathering female fire elemental, traveling through her world
Aisling, a recurring character in the British-made sitcom Derry Girls
Queen Aislinn, wife of the tyrant King Freyne and mother of King Einon in the movie Dragonheart
Ashelin in the Jak and Daxter video game series, introduced in Jak II
Aisling Duval, a princess of the Empire in the video game Elite: Dangerous
Aislinn Foy, the main character in Melissa Marr's novel Wicked Lovely
Aisling Laffrey, a character in the video game Path of Exile, member of Immortal Syndicate
Aisling "Ash" McCarthy, one of the two main characters in the novel Like
Aisling O'Connor, a main character in the novel Light a Penny Candle 
Aisling O'Dowd, a character in the television show Can't Cope, Won't Cope
Aisling Querelle, a character in the television show Carnival Row
Aislinn Wishart, a character in the Japanese manga Saki
Aisling Noon, a character in The Wheel of Time book series by Robert Jordan

See also
Ashlyn (disambiguation)
Ashley (name)
List of Irish-language given names

References

Irish-language feminine given names